Fonteinkloof Pass, (English: Fountain Gap), is situated in the Eastern Cape, province of South Africa, on the regional road R72, between Port Elizabeth and Alexandria, Eastern Cape.

Mountain passes of the Eastern Cape